In information retrieval, tf–idf (also TF*IDF, TFIDF, TF–IDF, or Tf–idf), short for term frequency–inverse document frequency, is a numerical statistic that is intended to reflect how important a word is to a document in a collection or corpus. It is often used as a weighting factor in searches of information retrieval, text mining, and user modeling.
The tf–idf value increases proportionally to the number of times a word appears in the document and is offset by the number of documents in the corpus that contain the word, which helps to adjust for the fact that some words appear more frequently in general. tf–idf has been one of the most popular term-weighting schemes. A survey conducted in 2015 showed that 83% of text-based recommender systems in digital libraries use tf–idf.

Variations of the tf–idf weighting scheme are often used by search engines as a central tool in scoring and ranking a document's relevance given a user query. tf–idf can be successfully used for stop-words filtering in various subject fields, including text summarization and classification.

One of the simplest ranking functions is computed by summing the tf–idf for each query term; many more sophisticated ranking functions are variants of this simple model.

Motivations

Term frequency 
Suppose we have a set of English text documents and wish to rank them by which document is more relevant to the query, "the brown cow". A simple way to start out is by eliminating documents that do not contain all three words "the", "brown", and "cow", but this still leaves many documents. To further distinguish them, we might count the number of times each term occurs in each document; the number of times a term occurs in a document is called its term frequency.  However, in the case where the length of documents varies greatly, adjustments are often made (see definition below). The first form of term weighting is due to Hans Peter Luhn (1957) which may be summarized as:

Inverse document frequency 
Because the term "the" is so common, term frequency will tend to incorrectly emphasize documents which happen to use the word "the" more frequently, without giving enough weight to the more meaningful terms "brown" and "cow". The term "the" is not a good keyword to distinguish relevant and non-relevant documents and terms, unlike the less-common words "brown" and "cow". Hence, an inverse document frequency factor is incorporated which diminishes the weight of terms that occur very frequently in the document set and increases the weight of terms that occur rarely.

Karen Spärck Jones (1972) conceived a statistical interpretation of term-specificity called Inverse Document Frequency (idf), which became a cornerstone of term weighting:
For example, the df and idf for some words in Shakespeare's 37 plays are as follows:

We see that "Romeo", "Falstaff", and "salad" appears in very few plays, so seeing these words, one could be quite certain which play it is. In contrast, "good" and "sweet" appears in every play and are completely uninformative as to which play it is.

Definition 

 The tf–idf is the product of two statistics, term frequency and inverse document frequency. There are various ways for determining the exact values of both statistics.
 A formula that aims to define the importance of a keyword or phrase within a document or a web page.

Term frequency 

Term frequency, is the relative frequency of term  within document , 
,
where  is the raw count of a term in a document, i.e., the number of times that term  occurs in document . Note the denominator is simply the total number of terms in document  (counting each occurrence of the same term separately). There are various other ways to define term frequency:

 the raw count itself: 
 logarithmically scaled frequency: ;
 augmented frequency, to prevent a bias towards longer documents, e.g. raw frequency divided by the raw frequency of the most frequently occurring term in the document:

Inverse document frequency 

The inverse document frequency is a measure of how much information the word provides, i.e., if it is common or rare across all documents. It is the logarithmically scaled inverse fraction of the documents that contain the word (obtained by dividing the total number of documents by the number of documents containing the term, and then taking the logarithm of that quotient):

with
 : total number of documents in the corpus 
  : number of documents where the term  appears (i.e.). If the term is not in the corpus, this will lead to a division-by-zero.

Term frequency–inverse document frequency 

Then tf–idf is calculated as

A high weight in tf–idf is reached by a high term frequency (in the given document) and a low document frequency of the term in the whole collection of documents; the weights hence tend to filter out common terms. Since the ratio inside the idf's log function is always greater than or equal to 1, the value of idf (and tf–idf) is greater than or equal to 0. As a term appears in more documents, the ratio inside the logarithm approaches 1, bringing the idf and tf–idf closer to 0.

Justification of idf 
Idf was introduced as "term specificity" by Karen Spärck Jones in a 1972 paper. Although it has worked well as a heuristic, its theoretical foundations have been troublesome for at least three decades afterward, with many researchers trying to find information theoretic justifications for it.

Spärck Jones's own explanation did not propose much theory, aside from a connection to Zipf's law. Attempts have been made to put idf on a probabilistic footing, by estimating the probability that a given document  contains a term  as the relative document frequency,

so that we can define idf as

Namely, the inverse document frequency is the logarithm of "inverse" relative document frequency.

This probabilistic interpretation in turn takes the same form as that of self-information. However, applying such information-theoretic notions to problems in information retrieval leads to problems when trying to define the appropriate event spaces for the required probability distributions: not only documents need to be taken into account, but also queries and terms.

Link with information theory 

Both term frequency and inverse document frequency can be formulated in terms of information theory; it helps to understand why their product has a meaning in terms of joint informational content of a document. A characteristic assumption about the distribution  is that:

This assumption and its implications, according to Aizawa: "represent the heuristic that tf–idf employs."

The conditional entropy of a "randomly chosen" document in the corpus , conditional to the fact it contains a specific term  (and assuming that all documents have equal probability to be chosen) is:

The mutual information can be expressed as

The last step is to expand , the unconditional probability to draw a term, with respect to the (random) choice of a document, to obtain:

This expression shows that summing the Tf–idf of all possible terms and documents recovers the mutual information between documents and term taking into account all the specificities of their joint distribution. Each Tf–idf hence carries the "bit of information" attached to a term x document pair.

Example of tf–idf 
Suppose that we have term count tables of a corpus consisting of only two documents, as listed on the right.

The calculation of tf–idf for the term "this" is performed as follows:

In its raw frequency form, tf is just the frequency of the "this" for each document. In each document, the word "this" appears once; but as the document 2 has more words, its relative frequency is smaller.

An idf is constant per corpus, and accounts for the ratio of documents that include the word "this". In this case, we have a corpus of two documents and all of them include the word "this".

So tf–idf is zero for the word "this", which implies that the word is not very informative as it appears in all documents.

The word "example" is more interesting - it occurs three times, but only in the second document:

Finally,

(using the base 10 logarithm).

Beyond terms 
The idea behind tf–idf also applies to entities other than terms. In 1998, the concept of idf was applied to citations. The authors argued that "if a very uncommon citation is shared by two documents, this should be weighted more highly than a citation made by a large number of documents". In addition, tf–idf was applied to "visual words" with the purpose of conducting object matching in videos, and entire sentences. However, the concept of tf–idf did not prove to be more effective in all cases than a plain tf scheme (without idf). When tf–idf was applied to citations, researchers could find no improvement over a simple citation-count weight that had no idf component.

Derivatives 
A number of term-weighting schemes have derived from tf–idf. One of them is TF–PDF (term frequency * proportional document frequency). TF–PDF was introduced in 2001 in the context of identifying emerging topics in the media. The PDF component measures the difference of how often a term occurs in different domains. Another derivate is TF–IDuF. In TF–IDuF, idf is not calculated based on the document corpus that is to be searched or recommended. Instead, idf is calculated on users' personal document collections. The authors report that TF–IDuF was equally effective as tf–idf but could also be applied in situations when, e.g., a user modeling system has no access to a global document corpus.

See also 

 Word embedding
 Kullback–Leibler divergence
 Latent Dirichlet allocation
 Latent semantic analysis
 Mutual information
 Noun phrase
 Okapi BM25
 PageRank
 Vector space model
 Word count
 SMART Information Retrieval System

References

External links and suggested reading 
 Gensim is a Python library for vector space modeling and includes tf–idf weighting.
 Anatomy of a search engine
 tf–idf and related definitions as used in Lucene
 TfidfTransformer in scikit-learn
 Text to Matrix Generator (TMG)  MATLAB toolbox that can be used for various tasks in text mining (TM) specifically  i) indexing, ii) retrieval, iii) dimensionality reduction, iv) clustering, v) classification. The indexing step offers the user the ability to apply local and global weighting methods, including tf–idf.
 Term-frequency explained Explanation of term-frequency

Statistical natural language processing
Ranking functions
Vector space model